Paul Graf Wolff Metternich zur Gracht (December 5, 1853 – November 29, 1934) was a Prussian and German ambassador in London (1901–1912) and Constantinople (1915–1916). He was a prominent German opponent of Ottoman actions during the Armenian genocide.

Diplomatic career

Count Metternich held early diplomatic postings in London, Brussels and South America.

He was appointed Envoy Extraordinary from the German Empire to the Court of St. James's in September 1901 in the absence for illness of the Ambassador, Count von Hatzfeldt. He was formally appointed German Ambassador in November, when Count Hatzfeldt resigned shortly before his death. King Edward VII received his credentials at Marlborough House on 2 December 1901.

He wrote in a report to Chancellor Theobald von Bethmann Hollweg on July 10, 1916, "In a realisation of their plan to resolve the Armenian Question by destroying the Armenian race, the Turkish Government is not stopped neither by our representatives, nor by the public opinion of the west".

Honours

German Honours
: Order of the Crown, First class

Foreign Honours
: Honorary Knight Grand Cross of the Royal Victorian Order, GCVO - 1 February 1901.

See also
Witnesses and testimonies of the Armenian genocide

References

External links

 "Modern Genocide: The Curse of the Nation State and Ideological Political Parties: The Armenian Case"
 Letter of Wolff Metternich to Bethmann Hollweg, Feb 17, 1916 (ger)
 "Wer am Leben blieb, wurde nackt gelassen" - Die Zeit, March 23, 2005 No 13 (ger)
 

1853 births
1934 deaths
Witnesses of the Armenian genocide
Honorary Knights Grand Cross of the Royal Victorian Order
Ambassadors of Germany to Turkey
Ambassadors of Germany to the United Kingdom